Riccardo Menciotti (born 28 September 1994) is an Italian Paralympic swimmer who won a bronze medal at 2020 Summer Paralympics.

References

External links 
 
 Riccardo Menciotti at Olympic.com

1994 births
Living people
Paralympic swimmers of Italy
Swimmers at the 2016 Summer Paralympics
Swimmers at the 2020 Summer Paralympics
Medalists at the 2020 Summer Paralympics
Paralympic medalists in swimming
Paralympic bronze medalists for Italy
Medalists at the World Para Swimming Championships
Medalists at the World Para Swimming European Championships
People from Terni
Italian male freestyle swimmers
Italian male backstroke swimmers
Italian male butterfly swimmers
S10-classified Paralympic swimmers
Sportspeople from the Province of Terni
21st-century Italian people